The 2014 LA Galaxy II season was the club's first season of existence. This season LA Galaxy II participated in the USL Pro and the U.S. Open Cup.

Players

Squad information 
The squad of LA Galaxy II was composed of an unrestricted number of first-team players on loan to the reserve team, players signed by Galaxy II, and LA Galaxy Academy players. Academy players who appeared in matches with LA Galaxy II retained their college eligibility.

Daniel Steres was named captain, and was named Defender of the Year.

Coaching staff

Friendlies

USL Pro

Standings

Results summary

Regular season 
All times from this point on Pacific Daylight Saving Time (UTC−07:00)

Playoffs 

The 2014 USL PRO Playoffs include the top eight finishers in the table, with the quarterfinals (No. 1 vs. No. 8, No. 2 vs. No. 7, etc.) set for the weekend of September 12–14. The semifinals featuring the four remaining teams will be played the following weekend, with the 2014 USL PRO Championship set for the weekend of September 26–28. All playoff rounds feature a single-game knockout format and teams will not be re-seeded following each round.

Quarter-final

Semi-finals

U.S. Open Cup

Second round

Third round

See also 
 2014 in American soccer
 2014 USL Pro season
 2014 LA Galaxy season

References

External links 
 

LA Galaxy
LA Galaxy II
LA Galaxy II